Ad-Dahi is a city in Al Hudaydah Governorate, Yemen. It has a population of 14,760 and is the largest city in Ad Dahi District.

See also 
 List of cities in Yemen

References 

Cities in Yemen
Populated places in Al Hudaydah Governorate